The Party of Farmers and Labourers was a political party in Greece in the 1950s.

History
The party first contested national elections in 1950, when it won three seats in the Hellenic Parliament with 2.6% of the vote. However, it did not contest any further elections.

References

Defunct political parties in Greece
Labour parties
Agrarian parties in Greece
Defunct agrarian political parties